The ABA League Coach of the Season award, also known as the Adriatic League Coach of the Season award, is an annual award given by the Adriatic League (ABA League), which is a European regional league, that is the top-tier level professional basketball league for clubs from the Former Yugoslavia. The award is given to the league's best head coach. The inaugural award was given out in the 2013–14 ABA season.

Award winners

See also 
 List of ABA League-winning coaches

References

External links
 
 ABA League at Eurobasket.com

Coach of the Season